Tariq Ahmed Karim is a Bangladeshi diplomat and former ambassador to the United States and the former High Commissioner to India. Currently he is the Chairman of Bangladesh Institute of International and Strategic Studies.

Education 

Karim completed his secondary education at St. Gregory's High School and College in 1960 and higher secondary from Notre Dame College, Dhaka in 1962. Later he completed his graduation in 1965 from the University of Dhaka and started his career. Later he received post-graduate degree from University of Maryland, College Park.

Career 
Karim joined the Pakistan Foreign Service in 1967.

From 1995 to 1997, Karim was the Additional Foreign Secretary and was responsible for South Asian region at the ministry. He was the lead Bangladeshi negotiator over the sharing the water of the Ganges and successfully signed a 30-year treaty in 1996.

Karim was the  High Commissioner of Bangladesh to South Africa. He also represented Bangladesh in Botswana, Lesotho, and Namibia concurrently.

In 2001, Karim was the ambassador of Bangladesh to the United States.

In July 2009, Karim was appointed the High Commissioner of Bangladesh to India by Prime Minister Sheikh Hasina.

Karim is the director of Centre for Bay of Bengal Studies based in the Independent University, Bangladesh. In January 2021, he joined the Cosmos Foundation, a trustee of Cosmos Group, as an advisor.

References 

Living people
Academic staff of Notre Dame College, Dhaka
University of Dhaka alumni
University of Maryland, College Park alumni
Bangladeshi diplomats
High Commissioners of Bangladesh to India
Ambassadors of Bangladesh to the United States
High Commissioners of Bangladesh to South Africa
Place of birth missing (living people)
Date of birth missing (living people)
Year of birth missing (living people)